Michael Gear  may refer to:
Michael Gear (bishop) (1934–2018), English bishop
Michael Gear (cricketer) (born 1945), English cricketer
W. Michael Gear (born 1955), American writer